The Baroness and the Butler is a 1938 American romantic comedy film based on the play Jean by Ladislaus Bus-Fekete. Directed by Walter Lang, it stars William Powell and, in her American English-language debut, Annabella.

Plot
Johann Porok, a third-generation butler in the service of Count Albert Sandor, the Prime Minister of Hungary, is unexpectedly elected to the Hungarian parliament, representing the opposition social progressive party. Despite this, he insists on remaining a servant as well. Count Sandor is pleased with this peculiar arrangement, as he has found Johann to be the perfect butler and does not wish to break in a new man. His daughter, Baroness Katrina Marissey, however, considers Johann a traitor and treats him very coldly.

In parliament, Johann attacks the Prime Minister, his employer, for yearly promising much to the poor underclass and delivering nothing, always citing "difficulties". To Katrina's puzzlement, the Count is not offended in the least and remains quite friendly with Johann. Within three months, Johann becomes the leader of his party. Katrina becomes more and more furious, finally throwing her purse and striking Johann in parliament during one of his scathing speeches. When his colleagues assume it was thrown by someone from the ruling conservative party, a brawl breaks out, and Johann and the Prime Minister hastily depart. Baron Georg Marissey, Katrina's husband and another member of parliament, later informs them that a vote of confidence was held after they left; the Count lost and will have to resign as Prime Minister. He is pleased to be able to spend more time with his wife. However, he reluctantly discharges Johann, as he has been neglecting his duties as head butler. They part good friends.

When Katrina holds a ball, her ambitious husband invites Johann without her knowledge. Left alone together, Katrina gradually warms to Johann. Then he confesses that he loves her, and that is why he is trying to better himself, even though he knows his cause is hopeless. Katrina embraces and kisses him. They are interrupted by Georg and Major Andros, another ardent admirer of Katrina. In private, Georg offers to divorce Katrina in return for Johann nominating him for the office of Minister of Commerce. Despite Katrina's strong opposition, Johann does just that in parliament. However, Katrina denounces the bargain in public, and Georg is forced to leave the parliamentary chamber in disgrace. In the final scene, Johann Porok is served breakfast in bed by the "maid", Katrina, who is revealed to be Mrs. Porok.

Cast
 William Powell as Johann Porok
 Annabella as Baroness Katrina Marissey
 Helen Westley as Countess Sandor
 Henry Stephenson as Count Albert Sandor
 Joseph Schildkraut as Baron Georg Marissey
 J. Edward Bromberg as Zorda
 Nigel Bruce as Major Andros
 Lynn Bari as Klari, a maid attracted to Johann
 Maurice Cass as Radio Announcer
 Ivan F. Simpson as Count Dormo (as Ivan Simpson)
 Alphonse Ethier as President
 Claire Du Brey as Martha

Production
According to Robert Osborne, host of Turner Classic Movies, Powell decided that work would ease his grief over the untimely death of his girlfriend, Jean Harlow, on June 7, 1937. He had also undergone surgery for cancer. Osborne suggests that he welcomed being loaned out to Twentieth Century-Fox, rather than working for his home studio of Metro-Goldwyn-Mayer, which had strong associations with Harlow.

Another motivation, not revealed at the time, was Powell's insistence that Fox sign his ex-wife Eileen Wilson Powell to a two-year film contract.  She was a stage actress who had long wished to make films.  Ironically, a sudden onset of severe illness prevented her from making any films under this contract before her early death in 1942.

References

External links
 
 

1938 films
1938 romantic comedy films
American romantic comedy films
American black-and-white films
American films based on plays
Films directed by Walter Lang
Films set in Hungary
Films with screenplays by Lamar Trotti
20th Century Fox films
Films with screenplays by Kathryn Scola
1930s English-language films
1930s American films